is a Japanese  professional boxer.

Professional career
Hisataka has challenged for a world title four times; twice at Flyweight and twice at Super Flyweight, but he was unsuccessful in all four attempts. At Flyweight, he lost to Takefumi Sakata on July 30, 2008 and Denkaosan Kaovichit on May 26, 2009; with the WBA Flyweight title on the line in both bouts. At Super Flyweight, he lost to Hugo Fidel Cazares on December 23, 2010 with the WBA Super Flyweight title on the line and Omar Andrés Narváez on August 24, 2013 with the WBO Super Flyweight title on the line.

Professional boxing record 

| style="text-align:center;" colspan="8"|24 Wins (10 Knockouts, 14 Decisions), 16 Defeats (2 Knockouts, 14 Decisions), 1 Draw
|-  style="text-align:center; background:#e3e3e3;"
|  style="border-style:none none solid solid; "|Res.
|  style="border-style:none none solid solid; "|Record
|  style="border-style:none none solid solid; "|Opponent
|  style="border-style:none none solid solid; "|Type
|  style="border-style:none none solid solid; "|Rd., Time
|  style="border-style:none none solid solid; "|Date
|  style="border-style:none none solid solid; "|Location
|  style="border-style:none none solid solid; "|Notes
|- align=center
|Win
|24-13-1
|align=left| Keisuke Tabuchi
|
|
|
|align=left|
|align=left|
|- align=center
|Win
|23-13-1
|align=left| Keisuke Nakayama
|
|
|
|align=left|
|align=left|
|- align=center
|Loss
|22-13-1
|align=left| Takuya Kogawa
|
|
|
|align=left|
|align=left|
|- align=center
|Loss
|22-12-1
|align=left| Ryo Matsumoto
|
|
|
|align=left|
|align=left|
|- align=center
|Loss
|22-11-1
|align=left| Omar Andrés Narváez
|
|
|
|align=left|
|align=left|
|- align=center
|Win
|22-10-1
|align=left| Sonny Boy Jaro
|
|
|
|align=left|
|align=left|
|- align=center
|Loss
|21-10-1
|align=left| Oleydong Sithsamerchai
|
|
|
|align=left|
|align=left|
|- align=center
|Win
|21-9-1
|align=left| Tetsuya Hisada
|
|
|
|align=left|
|align=left|
|- align=center
|Win
|20-9-1
|align=left| Suknavin Or Benjamad
|
|
|
|align=left|
|align=left|
|- align=center
|Loss
|19-9-1
|align=left| Hugo Fidel Cazares
|
|
|
|align=left|
|align=left|
|- align=center
|Win
|19-8-1
|align=left| Panomroonglek Kaiyanghadaogym
|
|
|
|align=left|
|align=left|
|- align=center
|Win
|18-8-1
|align=left| Ratanadet PorThitima
|
|
|
|align=left|
|align=left|
|- align=center
|Loss
|17-8-1
|align=left| Denkaosan Kaovichit
|
|
|
|align=left|
|align=left|
|- align=center
|Win
|17-7-1
|align=left| Yuki Takahashi
|
|
|
|align=left|
|align=left|
|- align=center
|Loss
|16-7-1
|align=left| Takefumi Sakata
|
|
|
|align=left|
|align=left|
|- align=center
|Win
|16-6-1
|align=left| Hussein Hussein
|
|
|
|align=left|
|align=left|
|- align=center
|Loss
|15-6-1
|align=left| Wyndel Janiola
|
|
|
|align=left|
|align=left|
|- align=center
|Loss
|15-5-1
|align=left| Panomroonglek Kaiyanghadaogym
|
|
|
|align=left|
|align=left|
|- align=center
|Loss
|15-4-1
|align=left| Kenji Yoshida
|
|
|
|align=left|
|align=left|
|- align=center
|Win
|15-3-1
|align=left| Saming Twingym
|
|
|
|align=left|
|align=left|
|- align=center
|Win
|14-3-1
|align=left| Federico Catubay
|
|
|
|align=left|
|align=left|
|- align=center
|Win
|13-3-1
|align=left| Takafumi Himeno
|
|
|
|align=left|
|align=left|
|- align=center
|Win
|12-3-1
|align=left| Yuchi Carryboy
|
|
|
|align=left|
|align=left|
|- align=center
|Win
|11-3-1
|align=left| Bert Batawang
|
|
|
|align=left|
|align=left|
|- align=center
|Loss
|10-3-1
|align=left| Tomonobu Shimizu
|
|
|
|align=left|
|align=left|
|- align=center
|Win
|10-2-1
|align=left| Takahiro Takemura
|
|
|
|align=left|
|align=left|
|- align=center
|Win
|9-2-1
|align=left| Tsunejiro Sato
|
|
|
|align=left|
|align=left|
|- align=center
|Win
|8-2-1
|align=left| Chiharu Manda
|
|
|
|align=left|
|align=left|
|- align=center
|Win
|7-2-1
|align=left| Takeshi Honda
|
|
|
|align=left|
|align=left|
|- align=center
|Win
|6-2-1
|align=left| Masato Kirino
|
|
|
|align=left|
|align=left|
|- align=center
|Win
|5-2-1
|align=left| Masayuki Kawaguchi
|
|
|
|align=left|
|align=left|
|- align=center
|Win
|4-2-1
|align=left| Takashi Morishima
|
|
|
|align=left|
|align=left|
|- align=center
|Win
|3-2-1
|align=left| Nobumasa Tanaka
|
|
|
|align=left|
|align=left|
|- align=center
|Draw
|2-2-1
|align=left| Masato Kirino
|
|
|
|align=left|
|align=left|
|- align=center
|Win
|2-2
|align=left| Kimihito Hori
|
|
|
|align=left|
|align=left|
|- align=center
|Win
|1-2
|align=left| Masayoshi Nishi
|
|
|
|align=left|
|align=left|
|- align=center
|Loss
|0-2
|align=left| Keita Omi
|
|
|
|align=left|
|align=left|
|- align=center
|Loss
|0-1
|align=left| Hirofumi Shiraishi
|
|
|
|align=left|
|align=left|

References 

1985 births
Living people
Japanese male boxers
Sportspeople from Osaka
Bantamweight boxers